This is a list of the 54 municipalities in the province of Santa Cruz de Tenerife in the autonomous community of the Canary Islands, Spain - 31 on Tenerife Island, 14 on La Palma Island, 6 on La Gomera Island and 3 on El Hierro Island.

References

See also

Geography of Spain
List of cities in Spain
List of municipalities in Las Palmas

 
Santa Cruz de Tenerife
municipalities in Santa Cruz de Tenerife